Televizioni Klan, also shortened to TV Klan, is an Albanian private television channel with national coverage, based in Tirana, Albania.

History and profile
TV Klan launched as a Franco-Albanian joint-venture, with its first broadcast airing on 25 October 1997. It is the first private TV channel in Albania.

In 2002, ISO rated the channel as the most highly rated in Albania with 21.5% of audience share. As of 2006, the channel's analogue signal covered around 60% of Albania's territory.

TV Klan is a media group that includes Klan Plus, Radio Klan, Klan News, Klan Music, ABC News (Albania), and North Macedonia-based Klan Macedonia. The channel package is available in Europe through Tring (pay tv) and Digitalb (pay tv) platforms. The package is also available, for free, in all around the world trought OTT application KLANI IM (Android and IOS).

TV Klan is widely known for its long-standing political show Opinion, hosted by Blendi Fevziu; entertainment shows such as Këngët e Shekullit, Gjeniu i Vogël, Dance with Me, X Factor Albania, Kënga Ime, Zonë e Lirë, E Diela Shqiptare, Xing me Ermalin, Stop, Rudina, Aldo Morning Show; and a wide range of co-productions.

Since 4 March 2012, TV Klan has been the first national TV channel in southeastern Europe and Albania to begin broadcasting 24 hours in HD without charging additional fees to customers. It is the first station in Albania to own a satellite news gathering mobile broadcasting studio.

On 3 May 2018, TV Klan announced that it had signed an agreement to purchase 100% of the assets of Art Channel, an Albanian broadcaster in North Macedonia. The channel was re-branded with the name Klan Macedonia.

In 2020, Radio Klan became the third privately-owned radio station to receive national frequency status in Albania.

Broadcasting outlets

Television

Programs

TV programs made and broadcast by TV Klan

International TV shows broadcast by TV Klan

See also
Television in Albania
Vizion Plus
Tring
Klan Kosova
ABC News Albania
Klan Macedonia
Tring Sport

References

External links
Official website

1997 establishments in Albania
Television networks in Albania
Television channels and stations established in 1997
Mass media in Tirana